The Teacher is a 2022 four-part drama produced by Channel 5, created by Mike Benson and Barunka O'Shaughnessy. It stars Sheridan Smith as Jenna Garvey, a secondary school teacher accused of having sexual intercourse with a 15-year-old pupil. It consists of four episodes, which were shown over four successive evenings from 31 January 2022.

Plot summary
Jenna Garvey is an English teacher who is good at her job and popular with her pupils, but has a shambolic personal life. She is charged with having sex with one of her pupils, Kyle, after a drunken night out.

Jenna decides to plead guilty, since she was too drunk to remember what happened on the night in question, and she wants to avoid forcing Kyle to give evidence. She receives a suspended sentence and a community service order. Soon after, she discovers that the evidence against her was fabricated.

Cast
Sheridan Smith as Jenna Garvey, an English teacher at Earlbridge School.
Samuel Bottomley as Kyle, a pupil at Earlbridge.
Cecilia Noble as Pauline, Jenna's colleague.
David Fleeshman as Roger Garvey, Jenna's father and a retired teacher.
Sharon Rooney as Nina, another English teacher who is jealous of Jenna.
Kelvin Fletcher as Jack, Jenna's colleague.
Sarah-Jane Potts as Mary, Kyle's mother
Tillie Amartey as Izzy, a pupil who is the daughter of Nina.
Ian Puleston-Davies as Brian
Karen Henthorn as DI Sowerby
Aaronveer Dhillon as Adnan 
Anil Desai as Rick Mills, Earlbridge’s headteacher.
Karen Bryson as Ava Mansouri, Jenna’s solicitor.
Matt Devere as Jojo, a bartender 
Reuben Johnson as Sean, Jenna's boyfriend 
Harry Hepple as Gabriel, a teacher

Production
Although the series is set in Bradford, it was mostly filmed in Budapest, Hungary, due to the financial savings offered by both cheaper overseas operating costs, and the financial support of the Hungarian Government and the Hungarian Film Institute. The final editing process combined the Hungarian material with a smaller number of scenes filmed in and around Bradford for the addition of scene-setting local landmarks.

Episodes

Reception
Carol Midgley of The Times gave it four out five stars, dubbing it "highly entertaining" thanks to Smith and the lurid plot elements. Sean O'Grady of The Independent also gave it four out five stars, praising Smith's performance. Anita Singh of The Daily Telegraph gave it three out of five stars, also commending Smith but questioning the script and direction.

References

External links

2022 British television series debuts
2022 British television series endings
2020s British crime drama television series
2020s British television miniseries
2020s high school television series
British high school television series
Channel 5 (British TV channel) original programming
Television series about educators
Television series about teenagers
Television shows filmed in Budapest
Television shows set in Bradford